American Digger is an American reality television series airing on Discovery Networks. The show follows former professional wrestler Frank Huguelet (aka Ric Savage) and his company American Savage as they search the United States for buried historical artifacts. The second season of the show was retitled Savage Family Diggers as Savage's wife Rita and son Nick join the crew.

On August 7, 2012, Spike TV announced that American Digger had been renewed for a second thirteen episode season. Filming of the new season began Fall 2012 and aired in Spring 2013.

Description
The series focuses on Savage and his crew as they travel across the United States searching for buried artifacts.  Searching historical documents, the team attempts to find locations that may contain artifacts that can be located using a variety of tools including shovels, pickaxes and metal detectors.  The crew has to negotiate with the various land owners for permission to dig on their land.  Due to many Americans being protective of their land it can be quite harrowing trying to find locations to dig. When valuable artifacts are discovered they are taken to various collectors and sold at which time the money would be split (ratio 20:80) between the land owner and Savage's team. The show has a famous catchphrase, "Boom Baby!" which is said by Savage every time the team would find something big.

The Savage Crew 

 Ric Savage
 Rita Savage (married Ric in 1999).
 Giuseppe "G" Savage, Ric's and Rita's eldest son.
 Nick Savage, their youngest son.
 Rue Shumate, 43 (left the crew)
 Bob Buttafuso (left the crew)

Controversies 
Professor of anthropology at the University of Florida Susan Gillespie criticized American Digger as well as the National Geographic Channel show "Diggers", saying, "Our main issue is that these shows promote the destruction and selling of artifacts which are part of our cultural heritage and patrimony."

The American Anthropological Association protested the show's presentation of archaeology as a "treasure-seeking adventure, in which our collective heritage is dug up and sold for monetary gain." Ric Savage's column in American Digger Magazine was cancelled. The publisher also filed a trademark infringement lawsuit against Viacom. Viacom reported that it obtained a license for the trademark.

Savage Family Diggers 
In December 2012, Spike TV announced that American Digger would be renamed Savage Family Diggers for its second season premiering January 30, 2013 at 10:30pm.  The name change better reflects the crew in the second season which adds Savage's wife Rita and son Nick to the dig team.

Episodes

American Digger

Savage Family Diggers

References

External links
 American Digger @ TV.com
 Official Website

2010s American reality television series
English-language television shows
Spike (TV network) original programming
2012 American television series debuts
2013 American television series endings